Varibaculum is a Gram-positive, facultatively anaerobic, non-spore-forming and non-motile genus of bacteria from the family of Actinomycetaceae.

References

Further reading 
 

Actinomycetales
Bacteria genera